The following highways are numbered 670:

Philippines
 N670 highway (Philippines)

United States
 
Interstate 670 (Kansas–Missouri), a connector highway within Kansas City
Interstate 670 (Ohio), a spur highway connecting Columbus, Ohio, to Gahanna, Ohio